The Napoleon LaRochelle Two-Family House is a historic house at 30 Pine Street in Southbridge, Massachusetts.  An excellent example of a vernacular Victorian duplex, it was probably built around 1890 for Napoleon LaRochelle, a polisher for the American Optical Company.  He owned this and another house next door which was built in the same style.  Its plan is a typical front-gable side entry layout, this time with a central cross gable.  It has some bargeboard decoration on the front gable, and its front porch features a basket-weave railing.

It was built in 1890 and added to the National Register of Historic Places in 1989.

See also
National Register of Historic Places listings in Southbridge, Massachusetts
National Register of Historic Places listings in Worcester County, Massachusetts

References

Houses completed in 1890
Houses in Southbridge, Massachusetts
National Register of Historic Places in Southbridge, Massachusetts
Houses on the National Register of Historic Places in Worcester County, Massachusetts